Marianne Humpelstetter (born 15 August 1964) is an Austrian swimmer. She competed in the women's 100 metre backstroke at the 1980 Summer Olympics.

References

External links
 

1964 births
Living people
Olympic swimmers of Austria
Swimmers at the 1980 Summer Olympics
People from Tulln an der Donau
Austrian female backstroke swimmers